MacPherson is a neighbourhood located within the district of Geylang in the Central Region of Singapore. Its location roughly corresponds to the identically titled subzone in the Geylang Planning Area and is approximately sandwiched between the neighbourhoods of Aljunied and Paya Lebar. MacPherson largely consists of various public housing estates centered on Circuit Road and an industrial area. The Pelton Canal runs through the neighbourhood, which separates a private housing estate off MacPherson Road, and the public housing estate along Circuit Road. 

Many residents in MacPherson are of the older generation, largely stemming from the fact that it was one of the first few major public housing projects to be enacted during the 1950s to 1970s. As a result, the majority of facilities in MacPherson are wheelchair and elderly-friendly. Nevertheless, there has been multiple built-to-order (BTO) public housing developments being constructed, such as MacPherson Spring and other developments such as MacPherson Weave, where construction is still in progress and are geared towards newly established young families.

It is served by MacPherson Community Club, which is operated by the People's Association (PA) with Residents' Committee (RCs) and Neighbourhood Committees (NCs) scattered around the entire neighbourhood. They organise various programmes for residents to interact and promote community involvement. Politically, it is represented in Parliament as the MacPherson Single Member Constituency, with Tin Pei Ling of the People's Action Party (PAP) as its Member of Parliament (MP) since 2011.

Etymology
The area is also alternatively called Jalan Klapa, as the area historically ran through a coconut plantation. MacPherson Road was named after Colonel Ronald MacPherson (1817–1869). MacPherson was involved in the First Opium War of 1841 and was appointed Staff Officer to the Artillery in the Straits Settlements in 1843. He succeeded Colonel H. Man as Executive Engineer and Superintendent of Convicts and Resident Councillor, Malacca in 1855 and 1857 respectively. 

He had been active in forming a local volunteer corps at the outbreak of the Crimean War and was appointed First Captain Commandment of the Singapore Volunteer Rifle Corps (SVRC) that was formed in 1854. When the first Municipal Act came into operation in 1856, he became an ex officio member of the Commission, becoming President on three later occasions. He was appointed the first Colonial Secretary when the Straits Settlements became a Crown Colony in 1867. 

MacPherson had also designed the current St Andrew's Cathedral along the lines of the ruined Netley Abbey in England and had built it in six years using forced penal labour sent over from the British Raj. Completed in 1862, the cathedral is considered one of the finest specimens of ecclesiastical architecture in the Far East. On the cathedral grounds, the architect is commemorated in a memorial called the MacPherson Memorial Monument. MacPherson died in 1869 and was subsequently buried at the old Bukit Timah Road Christian Cemetery, by which around this time Jalan Klapa was subsequently renamed in commemoration. The cemetery today has since been landscaped and made into a park.

The name Macpherson itself – or MacPherson or McPherson, according to different spellings – is believed to have come from the Gaelic Mac a' phearsain and means 'Son of the parson'. For some old folks it was called Persiaran Keliling.

Religion 
The neighbourhood is served by religious sites such as churches, temples and mosques. They include Trinity Christian Centre, Grace Baptist Church, Sallim Mattar Mosque and Huang Lao Xian Shi Temple. These religious organisations often have charity extensions and are actively serving the needy in the MacPherson neighbourhood.

Parks and greenspace 
Parks and recreational facilities are distributed around the neighbourhood, with the main park being the Pelton Park Connector, which stretches the entire distance from Balam Road to Paya Lebar Way. There are also larger parks such as the Aljunied Park located near the neighbourhood.

Education 
The Ministry of Education has a total of 4 mainstream Primary and Secondary Schools in MacPherson, Singapore. They are Geylang Methodist School (Primary), Geylang Methodist School (Secondary), Canossa Catholic Primary School, and St. Margaret's Primary School, which is temporarily relocated here for improvements work to be conducted on their old campus. There is also a school for special needs students, called Canossian School.

Infrastucture

Transportation 
The neighbourhood is served by the Circle MRT line and Downtown MRT line at MacPherson MRT station and Mattar MRT station.

Healthcare
The neighbourhood is served by the Geylang Polyclinic, which is operated by the National Healthcare Group (NHG). There are also many private general practitioners around the neighbourhood, usually located below the public housing flats.

The nearest shopping malls are 18 Tai Seng, Paya Lebar Square, and Paya Lebar Quarter. The majority of the shopping options here in MacPherson are located in the markets or along the HDB shophouses.

Hawker food culture 
A distinctive identity of MacPherson from the rest of Singapore are its hawker food culture. The neighbourhood's hawker centres are often featured and patronised by local media as well as food bloggers, including international ones. In particular, five distinctive and large hawker centres located in MacPherson encompasses the entire neighbourhood. 

To cater to the diversity of races and religions in MacPherson, and Singapore in general, they serve unique dishes stemming from Singaporean cuisine which had been created by the local Chinese, Malay, Indian and Eurasian communities. Most notably, the hawker centres that have been intensively featured by the news and on social media are 79 and 79A Circuit Road Hawker Centre, as well as the two-storey complex located at 80 Circuit Road Food Centre. 

Although hawker centres are widespread throughout the country, the allure towards MacPherson are due to the fact that the majority of the hawker stall owners are older and would prepare their food in the traditional styles, and due to the demographics of MacPherson, the cost of food is also lower for more widespread affordability. However, there is also a trend of newer hawkers, typically of a younger age, starting out their first hawker stall which sells regional Asian cuisines, such as Japanese and Thai cuisine.

References

Places in Singapore
Housing estates in Singapore
Geylang